Falkirk West was a county constituency represented in the House of Commons of the Parliament of the United Kingdom from 1983 until 2005. Together with a portion of Falkirk East, it was replaced by Falkirk.

Boundaries
1983–1997: The Falkirk District electoral divisions of Bonnybridge, Callendar, Carmuirs, Carronglen, Glenfuir, Grahamsdyke, Herbertshire, and Tryst.

1997–2005: The Falkirk District electoral divisions of Bainsford, Bonnybridge, Callendar, Carmuirs, Carronglen, Glenfuir, Grahamsdyke, Herbertshire, and Tryst.

Members of Parliament

Election results

Elections of the 1980s

Elections of the 1990s

Elections of the 2000s

References 

Historic parliamentary constituencies in Scotland (Westminster)
Constituencies of the Parliament of the United Kingdom established in 1983
Constituencies of the Parliament of the United Kingdom disestablished in 2005
Politics of Falkirk (council area)
Denny, Falkirk